Ruth W. Provost (born August 9, 1949 in Boston, Massachusetts) is an American politician who represented 2nd Plymouth District in the Massachusetts House of Representatives from 1997 to 2003.

References

1949 births
Democratic Party members of the Massachusetts House of Representatives
People from Sandwich, Massachusetts
University of Massachusetts Amherst alumni
Living people
Women state legislators in Massachusetts
Politicians from Boston
20th-century American politicians
20th-century American women politicians
21st-century American politicians
21st-century American women politicians